Tilt was a French magazine which began publication in September 1982, focused on computer and console gaming. It was the first French magazine specifically devoted to video games. The headquarters of the magazine was in Paris.

The name of the magazine was a nod to the pinball term, where excessive nudging of a pinball machine would result in a "tilt" penalty, and the loss of a turn during gameplay.  The final issue of Tilt was published January 1994.

References

External links
 Tiltback issues provided by abandonware-magazines.org
 Archived Tilt Magazines at Internet Archive

1982 establishments in France
1994 disestablishments in France
Defunct computer magazines
Defunct magazines published in France
French-language magazines
Video game magazines published in France
Magazines established in 1982
Magazines disestablished in 1994
Magazines published in Paris
Monthly magazines published in France